Andrew Mark Luger (born May 20, 1959) is an American attorney and lawyer who has served as the United States Attorney for the District of Minnesota since 2022. He previously served in that role from 2014 to 2017.

Education 

Luger received his Bachelor of Arts summa cum laude from Amherst College in 1981 and his Juris Doctor magna cum laude from Georgetown University Law Center in 1985.

Legal career 

Luger worked in private practice at the law firm Townley & Updike from 1985 to 1987 and Stillman, Friedman & Shaw from 1987 to 1989. From 1989 to 1992, he served as an Assistant United States Attorney in the Business Fraud Unit of the United States Attorney's Office for the Eastern District of New York and as an Assistant United States Attorney in the White Collar Unit of the United States Attorney’s Office for the District of Minnesota from 1992 to 1995. From 1995 to 2014, he served as partner at the law firm of Greene Espel.

United States attorney for the District of Minnesota

Service under Obama and Trump administrations 

On November 13, 2013, President Barack Obama nominated Luger to serve as the United States attorney for the District of Minnesota. On February 12, 2014, his nomination was confirmed in the Senate by voice vote. He was sworn in on February 14, 2014.

He was responsible for charges filed against nine men trying to join ISIS, the decision not to file charges against the police officers who killed Jamar Clark, and the Jacob Wetterling prosecution. He has specialized in anti-extremism legal work. After resigning as U.S. attorney in 2017, he became a partner at Jones Day.

Service under Biden administration 

On November 12, 2021, President Joe Biden announced his intent to nominate Luger to serve as the United States attorney for the District of Minnesota. On November 15, 2021, his nomination was sent to the United States Senate. On January 13, 2022, his nomination was reported out of the Senate Judiciary Committee. On March 24, 2022, his nomination was confirmed in a 60–34 vote. He was sworn into office on March 30, 2022.

References

1959 births
Living people
20th-century American lawyers
21st-century American lawyers
Amherst College alumni
Assistant United States Attorneys
Georgetown University Law Center alumni
Jones Day people
Minnesota Democrats
Minnesota lawyers
New York (state) lawyers
People from Cresskill, New Jersey
United States Attorneys for the District of Minnesota